Genoplesium cornutum, known as Corunastylis cornuta in Australia, is a small terrestrial orchid endemic to the Australian Capital Territory and nearby parts of New South Wales. It was first formally described in 2008 by David Jones who gave it the name Corunastylis cornuta from a specimen collected from the Black Mountain Reserve and the description was published in The Orchadian. In 2014 Julian Shaw changed the name to Genoplesium cornutum. The specific epithet (cornutum) is a Latin word meaning "bearing horns".

References

External links
 
 

cornutum
Endemic orchids of Australia
Orchids of the Australian Capital Territory
Orchids of New South Wales
Plants described in 2008